, provisionally named 2005 YU,  is a potentially hazardous asteroid  meters in diameter, as measured after its Earth flyby. Previously it was estimated to be 310 meters or about 400 m (1,300 feet) in diameter. It was discovered on 28 December 2005 by Robert S. McMillan at Steward Observatory, Kitt Peak. On 8 November 2011 it passed 0.85 lunar distances (324,900 kilometers; 201,900 miles) from Earth.

8 November 2011 flyby 

In February 2010,  was rated 1 on the Torino Scale for a potential pass near Earth on 10 November 2103, that posed no unusual level of danger. On 19 April 2010, radar ranging by the Arecibo radio telescope reduced uncertainties about the orbit by 50%. This improvement eliminated any possibility of an impact with Earth within the next 100 years. It was removed from the Sentry Risk Table on 22 April 2010 and as such it now has a rating of 0 on the Torino Scale. It is now known that on 10 November 2103  will be roughly 2 AU from Earth.

On 8 November 2011 at 23:28 UT the asteroid passed  from Earth. On 9 November 2011 at 07:13 UT the asteroid passed  from the Moon. During the close approach the asteroid reached about apparent magnitude 11, and would have been visible to experienced observers using high-end binoculars with an objective lens of 80 mm if it were not for bright moonlight preventing a true dark sky. Since the gibbous moon did interfere with the viewing, observers trying to visually locate the asteroid required a telescope with an aperture of 6 inches (15 centimeters) or larger.

The next few times a known asteroid this large will come this close to Earth will be in 2028 when  passes 0.65 LD from Earth, and in 2029 when the 325-meter 99942 Apophis comes even closer at just 0.10 LD.

The chances of an actual collision with an asteroid like  is about 1 percent in the next thousand years.

Study 

During the 2011 passage  was studied with radar using Goldstone, Arecibo, the Very Long Baseline Array, and the Green Bank Telescope.

Radar analysis has also helped to pin down the asteroid's albedo, or diffuse reflectivity. Although radar measurements do not detect visible light they can determine the distance and size of an object with a high degree of accuracy. This information, coupled with visible light measurements, provides a more accurate measure of an object's absolute magnitude, and therefore its albedo.

On 8 November 2011, NASA released a statement mentioning a number of structures on the surface of the asteroid, which were detected as it passed near Earth. On 11 November 2011, higher-resolution images showed concavities, a ridge near the asteroid's equator, and numerous features interpreted as decameter-scale boulders. Shape modeling based on the radar images shows that YU55's shape is close to spheroidal, with maximum dimensions of 360±40 m, and an equator-aligned ridge. A 150–200 meter-long, ~20 meter-high rise forms a portion of the ridge-line, and the number of boulders on the surface is comparable to that seen on the asteroid 25143 Itokawa by the Hayabusa spacecraft.

Optical lightcurve measurements during the flyby provided a more accurate estimate of the asteroid's spin period about 19.3 hours. Because  is so nearly spheroidal, it was not significantly torqued by Earth's tides during the flyby, and there is no evidence of non-principal-axis rotation. Optical, near-infrared, and ultraviolet spectroscopy confirmed that  is a C-type asteroid.

Future trajectory 
On 19 January 2029,  will pass  from Venus. The close approach distance to Venus in 2029 will determine how close the asteroid will pass to Earth in 2041. Radar astrometry in November 2011 clarified the Earth passage in 2041 and beyond.

References

External links 

 
 
 
 
 
 
 
 
 
 
 
 
 

308635
308635
308635
308635
308635
308635
20111108
20051228